WKKC (89.3 FM) is an educational non-profit radio station in Chicago, Illinois, owned by Kennedy–King College and broadcasting primarily to the city's South Side. The studio and transmitter are at the campus in the school's Englewood neighborhood. The station is used to train students in broadcasting and communications.

The station broadcasts in HD Radio with two subchannels, an urban adult contemporary format on HD1 and classic hip hop on HD2.

History

The station received its construction permit on August 5, 1975, more than a year after filing on May 6, 1974. Northwestern University, owner of co-channel WNUR in Evanston, objected, and the original application was returned and resubmitted. A license to cover was filed for in October 1975. Power was raised from 10 to 250 watts in 1985.

WKKC was the first radio station to play rap music in Chicago, on a program called "Rap House" hosted by Isadore "Pinkhouse" Pink, who later worked for WEJM (106.3 FM). The station was noted for its policy of refusing to play rap with violent lyrics during daytime hours. DJ Rashad later worked as a DJ at WKKC before becoming an electronic musician.

References

External links

KKC
KKC
Radio stations established in 1975
1975 establishments in Illinois